Wooden Warrior is a wooden roller coaster located at Quassy Amusement Park in Middlebury, Connecticut, United States. The coaster was designed and built by American wooden coaster designer The Gravity Group. Despite the coaster's small size, it has been well received by enthusiasts for its air time. The coaster features Gravitykraft's Timberliner trains and was the first wooden coaster to use such trains.

Awards

Note: Wooden Warrior has not charted in the Golden Ticket Awards since 2018.

References 

Wooden roller coasters
Roller coasters in Connecticut